The 2005 Cincinnati Masters (also known as the Western & Southern Financial Group Masters and Western & Southern Financial Group Women's Open for sponsorship reasons) was a tennis tournament played on outdoor hard courts. It was the 104th edition of the Cincinnati Masters, and was part of the ATP Masters Series of the 2005 ATP Tour, and of the Tier III Series of the 2005 WTA Tour. Both the men's and the women's events took place at the Lindner Family Tennis Center in Mason, near Cincinnati, Ohio, United States, with the men playing from August 15 through August 22, 2005, and the women from August 23 through August 30, 2005.

The men's field was led by World No. 1 Roger Federer. Other top seeded players were Rafael Nadal, Lleyton Hewitt, Marat Safin, and home favorite Andy Roddick.

The women's draw featured Patty Schnyder and Vera Zvonareva. Also competing were Jelena Janković, Daniela Hantuchová, and Marion Bartoli.

Finals

Men's singles

 Roger Federer defeated  Andy Roddick, 6–3, 7–5
It was Roger Federer's 9th title of the year, and his 31st overall. It was his 4th Masters title of the year and his 8th overall.

Women's singles

 Patty Schnyder defeated  Akiko Morigami 6–4, 6–0
It was Patty Schnyder's 2nd title of the year and her 10th overall.

Men's doubles

 Jonas Björkman /  Max Mirnyi defeated  Wayne Black /  Kevin Ullyett, 6–4, 5–7, 6–2

Women's doubles

 Laura Granville /  Abigail Spears defeated  Květa Peschke /  María Emilia Salerni 3–6, 6–2, 6–4

External links

Association of Tennis Professionals (ATP) tournament profile
Men's Singles draw
Men's Doubles draw
Men's Qualifying Singles draw
Women's Singles, Doubles and Qualifying Singles draws

 
Western and Southern Financial Group Masters
Western and Southern Financial Group Women's Open
Cincinnati Masters
Cincinnati Masters
Western and Southern Financial Group Masters